The Phillips' Congo shrew (Congosorex polli) is a species of mammal in the family Soricidae. It is endemic to Tanzania.

References 

Congosorex
Mammals described in 2005